Drift or Drifts may refer to:

Geography 
 Drift or ford (crossing) of a river
 Drift (navigation), difference between heading and course of a vessel
 Drift, Kentucky, unincorporated community in the United States
 In Cornwall, England:
 Drift, Cornwall, village
 Drift Reservoir, associated with the village

Science, technology, and physics 
 Directional Recoil Identification from Tracks, a dark matter experiment
 Drift (video gaming), a typical game controller malfunction
 Drift pin, metalworking tool for localizing hammer blows and for aligning holes
 Drift (geology), deposited material of glacial origin
 Drift, linear term of a stochastic process
 Drift (motorsport), the controlled sliding of a vehicle through a sharp turn, either via over-steering with sudden sharp braking, or counter-steering with a sudden "clutch kick" acceleration
 Incremental changes:
 Drift (linguistics), a type of language change
 Genetic drift, change in allele frequency
 Drift (telecommunication), long-term change in an attribute of a system or equipment
Clock drift
Frequency drift
Concept drift (data science and machine learning applications)

Film and television
 Drift (film series), 2006–2008 film series by Futoshi Jinno
 Drift, 2006 TV crime drama film directed by Paul W. S. Anderson
 Drift, fictional technology system that links the minds of two Jaeger pilots in the 2013 sci-fi film Pacific Rim and its sequel
 Drift (2013 Australian film), film starring Sam Worthington
 Drift (2013 Belgian film), art house film
 Drift (2015 film), Swiss film
 Drift (2017 film), German film
 Drift, 2007 experimental short film by Max Hattler
 Drift (2023 film), a film by Anthony Chen

Books and Publishing
 The Drift (magazine)
 Drift (novel), a 2002 Doctor Who novel
 Drift: The Unmooring of American Military Power, a book by Rachel Maddow
 Plot drift, when a story deviates unexpectedly from its initial direction, in writing, television, or other media.

Music
 The Drift (band), American post-rock band
 Songs:
 "Drift", 1985 song from work  ‘’Secret’’
 "Drift" (Emily Osment song) (2011)
 "Drift", end credits song of 2013 film Pacific Rim
 Albums/EPs:
 Drift (Flotsam and Jetsam album) (1995)
 The Drift, album by Scott Walker (2006)
 Drift (Ken Block album) (2008)
 Drift (Nosaj Thing album) (2009)
 The Drift (EP), by Michelle Channel and Arjun Singh (2014)
 Drift (Erra album) (2016)
 Drift (Underworld project), ongoing music-and-video experiment by that band

See also
 Daventry International Rail Freight Terminal (DIRFT), a rail-road intermodal freight terminal in Northamptonshire, England
 Dérive, an unplanned journey through a landscape
 Drifter (disambiguation)
 Drifting (disambiguation)
 Velddrif, a town in South Africa